See:
List of Hungarian Athletics Championships champions (men)
List of Hungarian Athletics Championships champions (women)